Kilrea could refer to the following:

 Kilrea - a village in Northern Ireland
 Kilrea, County Armagh, a townland in County Armagh, Northern Ireland
 Kilrea GAC - a football team

Ice hockey personnel
 Brian Kilrea - an ice hockey coach and former player
 Hec Kilrea - an ice hockey player
 Ken Kilrea (ice hockey) - an ice hockey player
 Wally Kilrea - an ice hockey player